Louis Fowler (25 August 1865 – 12 October 1927) was a New Zealand cricketer. He played first-class cricket for Nelson and Taranaki between 1882 and 1898.

See also
 List of Taranaki representative cricketers

References

External links
 

1865 births
1927 deaths
New Zealand cricketers
Nelson cricketers
Taranaki cricketers
Cricketers from Nelson, New Zealand